Hannah Benka-Coker, née Luke (1903 – 17 June 1952) was an educator from Sierra Leone. She is one of the founders of the Freetown Secondary School for Girls (FSSG) which was established in 1926.

Early life and education
Born Hannah Luke in British Sierra Leone, she was educated at the Portway Institute in England.

Freetown Secondary School for Girls
She organized a group of close family members and friends to plan a school that would offer a comprehensive, world-class education program for girls. One of her friends was Maisie Osora, the British wife of a Sierra Leonean clergyman, who was a teacher at the Annie Walsh Memorial School.

On 20 January 1926, the Freetown Secondary School for Girls opened at Garrison and Gloucester Streets with a student body of twenty girls. Osora was principal and Benka-Coker was as vice-principal.

The Freetown School for Girls was the only school that had classes from Kindergarten through Secondary School.

Eventually, Hannah became the school principal. During her tenure she accepted students from all over West Africa regardless of creed or tribe. The school moved to Tower Hill in Freetown and became a boarding school. Students flocked from The Gambia, The Gold Coast and Nigeria.

In 1944, Benka-Coker was awarded an MBE for her services to education.

Marriage and family 
She married a lawyer from the Gambia and became Hannah Benka-Coker.

Death
She died in June 1952, aged 49.

Legacy
Her contributions to the education of girls and women were lauded in Sierra Leone and internationally.

Benka-Coker has since had a statue erected in her honour.

See also 
Women in Sierra Leone
Index of Sierra Leone–related articles
George Beresford-Stooke
Annie Walsh Memorial School

References

  

1903 births
1952 deaths
Sierra Leone Creole people
People of Sierra Leone Creole descent
Sierra Leonean educators
20th-century Sierra Leonean people
Annie Walsh Memorial School alumni